The Rulkov map is a two-dimensional iterated map used to model a biological neuron. It was proposed by Nikolai F. Rulkov in 2001. The use of this map to study neural networks has computational advantages because the map is easier to iterate than a  continuous dynamical system. This saves memory and simplifies the computation of large neural networks.

The model

where  represents the membrane potential of the neuron. Unlike variable , variable  does not have explicit biological meaning, though some analogy to gating variables can be drawn. Different combinations of parameters  and  give rise to different dynamical states of the neuron like resting, tonic spiking and chaotic bursts. The chaotic bursting is enabled above

Analysis

The dynamics of the Rulkov map can be analyzed by analyzing the dynamics of its one dimensional fast submap. One of these fixed points is stable, another is unstable and third may change the stability. As  increases, two of these fixed points (stable one and unstable one) merge and disappear by saddle-node bifurcation.

See also
Biological neuron model
Hodgkin–Huxley model
FitzHugh–Nagumo model
Chialvo map

References

Dynamical systems